This is a selected list of musical compositions that feature a prominent part for the natural horn or the French horn, sorted by era and then by composer.

Baroque
Johann Sebastian Bach
 Brandenburg Concerto No. 1 in F major, BWV 1046
Johann Beer
Concerto à 4, for posthorn, hunting horn, two violins, and continuo, in B-flat major
Horn Concerto in B major
Johann Friedrich Fasch
Concerto for 2 Horns FaWV L:D14
Concerto for 2 Horns in D Major FaWV L:D18
Concerto for 2 Horns FaWV L F2
Christoph Förster
Concerto ex Dis [i.e., in E-flat], No. 1, for horn, two violins, viola and basso continuo, Lund manuscript No. 5 (Saml. Wenster J:1–17)
Concerto ex Dis Dur [i.e., in E-flat major] No. 2, for horn, two violins, viola and basso continuo, Lund manuscript
Carl Heinrich Graun
Concerto in D major for corno concertato, 2 violins, viola and basso
Trio ex D for horn, violin and Basso
Concerto in D major for horn, oboe d' amore and basso
Concerto in E major for horn, oboe d`amore and basso
Christoph Graupner
Concerto for 2 Horns in G major, GWV 332 
Anton Joseph Hampel
Concerto in D for horn, 2 violins, viola and basso
Georg Friedrich Händel
Concerto a due cori No. 2 in F major, HWV 333
Concerto a due cori No. 3 in F, HWV 334
Aria in F major HWV 410, for 2 horns, 2 oboes and bassoon
Johann David Heinichen
Concerto in F major, for 2 corni da caccia, 2 flutes, 2 violins, 2 violas, and basso continuo (Seibel 231, Haußwald I:15)
Concerto for 2 Horns, 2 Flutes, 2 Oboes, Strings & Continuo in F Major Seibel 233
Georg Melchior Hoffmann
2nd Concerto a 7 for horn, 2 violins, viola and basso continuo
Johann Melchior Molter
Concerto in D
Johann Georg Pisendel
Concerto in D for 2 Horns, 2 Oboes, Bassoon, Strings and continuo.
Johann Joachim Quantz
Concerto No. 1 in E-flat major
Concerto No. 2 in E-flat major
Concerto ex D-sharp major for corno concertato, oboe, 2 violins, viola and basso
III. Concerti a Corno concertato
Johann Christian Reinhardt
Concerto ex Dis-Dur [i.e., E-flat major] for corno concertato, 2 violins, viola, and basso continuo (Lund University Library MS Wenster J:1–17)
Friedrich Wilhelm Riedt
Concert a 5 for Horn, 2 Violins, Viola and Basso continuo
Johann Georg Roellig
Concerto in E-flat major
Concerto in D major
Concerto ex D major for Corno concertato, 2 Violins, Viola and Basso
Heinrich Schultz
Concerto ex D-sharp
Georg Philipp Telemann
Concerto in E-flat major, for 2 horns, strings, and continuo, TWV 54:Es1, from Musique de table, troisième Production (Table Music, third Production)
Concerto for Horn, Strings, and Continuo in D major, TWV 12:D8
Horn Concerto in E-flat
Concerto in D major for 2 horns and string orchestra, BA 8
Concerto in D major for 3 horns, violin, strings, and continuo, TWV 54:D2
Overture: Alster Echo in F, for 4 horns, 2 oboes, bassoon, strings, and continuo, TWV55:F11
Concerto a tre for Recorder, Horn and Continuo
Ouverture (Suite) in F Major for two horns
Antonio Vivaldi
Concerto in F for Two Horns, Strings, and Continuo, RV 538
Concerto in F for Two Horns, Strings, and Continuo, RV 539

Classical
Johann Georg Albrechtsberger
Horn Concerto in F
Concerto a 5 for Horn, 2 Violins, Viola and Basso continuo
Ludwig van Beethoven
Sonata in F major for Horn and Piano, Op. 17
Sextet in E-flat, Op. 81b (for 2 horns, 2 violins, viola and cello)
Frédéric Blasius
Symphonie concertante for 2 Horns and Orchestra
Luigi Boccherini
Sextet Es-dur für Horn, zwei Violinen, Viola und zwei Violoncelli
 Sextet Es-dur für Oboe, Violine, Viola, Horn, Fagott und Kontrabaß
Robert Nicolas Charles Bochsa
L´écho. Deuxième Nocturne pour Cor et Harpe
François-Adrien Boieldieu
Solo pour Cor avec accompagnement de Harpe
Franz Danzi
Trio in F major Op.24 for Violin, Horn and Bassoon
Sonata in E-flat, Op.28
Sonata in E minor, Op.44
Horn Concerto
Louis-François Dauprat
1st Concerto for Horn and Orchestra, Op. 1
2nd Concerto for Horn and Orchestra, Op. 9
3rd Concerto for Horn and Orchestra, Op. 18 ("Hommage d`Amitié et de Reconnaissance")
4th Concerto for Horn and Orchestra, Op. 19 ("Hommage à la Mémoire de Punto")
5th Concerto for Horn and Orchestra, Op. 21
Concertino for Horn
Sonate in F-major for horn and harp
Air Ecossais varié pour Cor et Harpe, Op.22
Horn Sonate, Op. 3
Sébastien Demar
Grand Duo concertant for Horn and Harp, Op. 60 
Concerto in D major for Horn and Orchestra
Frédéric Nicolas Duvernoy
Concerto No. 1
Concerto No. 2
Concerto No. 3
Concerto No. 4
Concerto No. 5
3 Trios for Clarinet, Horn and Bassoon, Op. 1
Fantasy for Horn and Piano
1-3 Nocturne for Horn and Harp

Concerto No. 1 for Horn and Orchestra
Friedrich Ernst Fesca
Potpourri for Horn and String Quartet, Op. 29
Andante and Rondo F major for Horn and Orchestra, Op. 39
Josef Fiala
Concerto for two horns, strings, and continuo
Concerto in E-flat

Fantaisie
Michael Haydn
Concertino for Two Horns
Concertino for Horn
Joseph Haydn
Horn Concerto in D, Hob. VIId:1 (1765) (lost)
Concerto for Two Horns in E-flat, Hob. VIId:2 (ca. 1760) (lost)
Horn Concerto No. 1 in D, Hob. VIId:3 (1762)
Horn Concerto No. 2 in D, Hob. VIId:4 (doubtful; possibly by Michael Haydn) (1781)
Concerto for Two Horns in E-flat, Hob. VIId:6 (doubtful; possibly by Michael Haydn or Antonio Rosetti; maybe Hob. VIId:2?)
Symphony No. 31 ("Horn Signal")
Franz Anton Hoffmeister
Horn Concerto No. 1
Concerto No. 1 for Two Horns in E
Concerto No. 2 for Two Horns in E
Romance for Three Horns and Orchestra
Premier Concerto in D major for solo horn
Louis-Emmanuel Jadin
3 Fantasies for Piano and Horn
Symphonie concertante for Clarinet, Horn, Bassoon and Orchestra in F major
Nikolaus von Krufft
Sonata for Horn and Piano in F
Variations for Horn and Piano
Sonata E major for Horn and Piano
Joseph Küffner
Divertissement, Op. 227
Martin Joseph Mengal
2 Fantaisies for Horn and Piano
Saverio Mercadante
Concerto for Horn
Leopold Mozart
Concerto for Two Horns and String Orchestra in E-flat major
Sinfonia da caccia for Four Horns, Shot-gun, and Strings in G major, "Jagdsinfonie"
Wolfgang Amadeus Mozart
Horn Concerto No. 1 in D, K. 412+514/386b (in two movements) (IMSLP listing)
Horn Concerto No. 2 in E-flat, K. 417 (in three movements) (IMSLP listing, Mutopia listing)
Horn Concerto No. 3 in E-flat, K. 447 (in three movements) (IMSLP listing, Mutopia listing)
Horn Concerto No. 4 in E-flat, K. 495 (in three movements) (IMSLP listing)
Horn Quintet (horn, violin, 2 violas, cello) in E-flat, K. 407 (in three movements) (WIMA listing)
Fragment for Horn and Orchestra in E-flat, K. 370b+371
Fragment for Horn and Orchestra in E, K. 494a
Sinfonia Concertante in E-flat for Oboe, Clarinet, Horn, Bassoon and Orchestra, K. 297b/Anh. 14.05 (probably an arrangement of Mozart's original K. Anh. 9/297B for Flute, Oboe, Horn and Bassoon with spurious orchestral parts)
12 Duets for Two Horns in C, K. 487
Johann Baptist Georg Neruda
Concert for Horn and Strings

Fantasy for Horn and Piano
Giovanni Paisiello
Andante (écrit pour la fête de I´Impératrice)
Franz Xaver Pokorny
Concerto No. 1 in D
Concerto No. 2 in D
Concerto No. 3 in D
Concerto in E major for horn, strings, and continuo
Concerto in E-flat major for two horns, strings, and continuo
Concerto in F major for two horns, strings, and continuo
Giovanni Punto
16 horn concerti (Nos. 9, 12, 13, 15 and 16 lost)
Concerto for two horns
 103 horn duos
47 horn trios
21 horn quartets
a horn sextet
Anton Reicha
24 Trios for three horns, Op. 82
Twelve Trios for two horns and bassoon or cello, Op. 93
Quintet for horn and string quartet in E major, Op. 106
Joseph Reicha
Concerto for Two Horns, Op. 5
Ferdinand Ries
Concerto for 2 Horns in E flat major WoO. 19
Sonata in F major Op.34
Introduction and Rondo for Horn and Piano, Op. 113, No. 2
Johann Peter Ritter
Concertante E major for horn, violoncello and orchestra (Concertante for horn and violoncello)
Antonio Rosetti
Two solo concertos in D minor, RWV 38-39
Eight solo concertos in E-flat, RWV 40-43, 47-49, 54
Three solo concertos now lost, RWV 44-46
Three solo concertos in E, RWV 50-52
One solo concerto in F, RWV 53
Concerto for Two Horns in E-flat major, RWV 56
Concerto for Two Horns in E-flat major, RWV 57
Concerto for Two Horns in E major, RWV 58
Concerto for Two Horns in E major, RWV 59
Concerto for Two Horns in F major, RWV 60
Concerto for Two Horns in F major, RWV 61
Johann Matthias Sperger
Concerto E-flat major for Horn and Orchestra (SWV B26)
Hornquartett in E-flat
12 Horn-Duos
Concerto in D
Carl Stamitz
Concerto in E-flat for solo horn, 2 flutes, 2 horns, and strings
Trio for Horn, Violin and Cello in E-flat
Anton Teyber
Two Concertos for Corni da Caccia

1st Symphonie concertante E-flat major for 2 horns solo and orchestra
Johann Christoph Vogel
Concertante No. 1 in E major for 2 Horns and Orchestra
Concertante No. 2 in E major for 2 Horns and Orchestra
Jacques Widerkehr
Symphonie concertante for Horn and Bassoon
Symphonie concertante for 2 Horns and Orchestra

Concerto in E-flat major for 2 horns and orchestra
Friedrich Witt
Concerto in E for Horn and Orchestra
Concerto for 2 Horns in F major (No. 4)
Concerto for 2 Horns in F major (No. 5)

Romantic
Vincenzo Bellini
Horn Concerto in F
Luigi Belloli
Concerto F minor for horn and orchestra
Concerto F major "Denominato Il trionfo dell' Innocenza" for horn and orchestra 
Gran Concerto for horn and orchestra
Hector Berlioz
Le jeune pâtre breton, Op. 13, No. 4 for tenor, horn and piano
Johannes Brahms
Trio in E-flat, Op. 40 for piano, violin, and horn (mutopia listing)
Emmanuel Chabrier
Larghetto for Horn and Orchestra
Luigi Cherubini
Horn Concerto
Sonata 1 and 2 for horn and strings
Cesar Cui
Perpetual Motion
Carl Czerny
Andante and Polacca in E major for horn and piano
Grande Serenade Concertante for clarinet, horn, cello, and piano
Claude Debussy
 Beau soir for horn and piano
Felix Draeseke
Adagio in A minor, Op. 31 for horn and piano 
Romance in F, Op. 32 for horn and piano
Quintet in B-flat major for piano, string trio and horn, Op. 48
Johannes Frederik Frøhlich
Hunting Piece for four differently crooked horns
Jacques-François Gallay
Horn Concerto No. 1
Horn Concerto No. 2
The Fantasy, Op. 34 for horn and piano
Quatuor, Op. 26 for 4 horns in different tones
Alexander Glazunov
Reverie
Charles Gounod
Six mélodies pour cor
Joseph Holbrooke
Horn Trio in D major, Op. 28
Heinrich Hübler
Concerto for four horns
Gustav Jenner
Trio for clarinet, horn and piano
Johann Wenzel Kalliwoda
Introduction and Rondo, Op.  51
Friedrich Daniel Rudolf Kuhlau
Concertino in F, Op. 45 for two horns
Ignaz Lachner
Concertino, Op. 43 for horn, bassoon and orchestra

Fantasie for horn and piano

Horn Concertino
Albert Lortzing
Konzertstück E-Dur

Serenata in Dis
Charles Oberthür
"Souvenir a Schwalbach", Op.  42 for horn and harp
"Mon sejour a Darmstadt", Op. 90 for horn (or two horns ad. lib.) and Harp
Max Reger
Scherzino for Horn and Strings
Carl Reinecke
Nocturne, Op. 112 for horn and strings
Trio in A minor, Op. 188 for horn, oboe and piano 
Trio in B♭ major, Op. 274 for horn, clarinet and piano
Carl Gottlieb Reißiger
Solo per il Corno
Joseph Rheinberger
Sonate Es-major, Op.  178 for horn and piano
Nikolai Rimsky-Korsakov
Notturno for horn quartet
Gioacchino Rossini
Prelude, Theme and Variations for horn and piano
Camille Saint-Saëns
Romance in F major, Op. 36 for horn and orchestra
Romance in E major, Op. 67 for horn and orchestra
Morceau de Concert in F minor, Op. 94 for horn and orchestra (Mutopia listing)
Georg Abraham Schneider
Concerto for Four Horns in E-flat (1817)
Concerto No. 1 in E major for three horns and orchestra
Concerto No. 2 in E major for three horns and orchestra
Franz Schubert
Auf dem Strom for tenor or soprano, horn and piano
Robert Schumann
Adagio and Allegro in A-flat, Op. 70 for horn and piano
Konzertstück (Concert Piece) in F, Op. 86 for four horns and orchestra
Jagdlieder, Op. 137 for four horns and male chorus in four voices

Variations for two waldhorns and orchestra
Exercice
Ludwig Schuncke
Duo Concertant for piano and horn
Alexander Scriabin
Romance for horn and piano
Leone Sinigaglia
Zwei Stücke
Romanza, Op. 3 for horn and string quartet
Gaspare Spontini
Divertimento for horn and harp
Franz Strauss
Fantasy on the Sehnsuchtswalzer of Schubert, Op. 2
Fantasy, Op. 6 for horn and orchestra
Nocturno, Op. 7 for horn and piano
Horn Concerto No. 1 in C minor, Op. 8
Romanze, Op. 12 for horn and piano ("Empfindungen am Meere")
Theme and Variations, Op. 13 for horn and piano
Les Adieux, for horn and piano
Johann Strauss
Dolci pianti
Carl Maria von Weber
Horn Concertino, Op. 45

20th century
Jean Absil
Rhapsodie No. 6, Op. 120
Hans Abrahamsen
6 Pieces for Violin, Horn and Piano
Mit Grønne Underlag
Landscapes for Horn, Oboe, Flute, Clarinet and Bassoon
Alexander Abramski
Concertino for Flute, Clarinet, Horn, Bassoon and Piano
Stephen Albert
Ecce Puer for Soprano, Oboe, Horn and Piano
Hugo Alfvén
Notturno Elegiaco, horn and organ, Op. 5
Douglas Allanbrook
The Majesty of the Horn
David Amram
Horn Concerto
Blues and Variations for Monk
Malcolm Arnold
Concerto No. 1 for Horn and Orchestra, Op. 11
Concerto No. 2 for Horn and Strings, Op. 58
Fantasy for Horn, Op. 88
Burlesque (1944)
Vyacheslav Artyomov
Fruhlings-Specht
Alexander Arutunian
Horn Concerto
Kurt Atterberg
Sonata in B minor, Op. 27
Horn Concerto in A major, Op. 28
Simon Bainbridge
Landscape and Memory
Don Banks
Horn Concerto
Trio for horn, violin, and piano
Krešimir Baranović
Concerto for Horn and Symphonic Orchestra
Carol Barnett
Sonata for Horn and Piano
Elsa Barraine
Crepuscules
Fanfare
James A. Beckel, Jr. 
The Glass Bead Game, Concerto for Horn and Orchestra (also available for band)
Richard Rodney Bennett
Actaeon. Concerto for Horn and Orchestra
Romances for Horn and Piano
Sonate for Horn and Piano
Niels Viggo Bentzon
Horn concerto
Sonate for Horn and Piano
Kopenhagener Konzert No. 1 for Flute, Horn, Trumpet, Cembalo and Strings
Trio for Horn, Trumpet and Trombone
Leonard Bernstein
Elegy for Mippy I
Lennox Berkeley
Trio for horn, violin, and piano, Op. 44
Sextet for Clarinet, Horn und String quartet
Quintett for Oboe, Clarinet, Bassoon, Horn and Piano
Richard Bissill
Three Portraits for horn octet
Corpendium 1 for six horns
Sinfonia Concertante for clarinet, trumpet, horn and orchestra
Bruno Bjelinski
Horn Concerto
Sonate for Horn
Arthur Bliss
 Rhapsodie für Mezzosopran, Tenor, Flöte, Horn und Streichquintett
Hakon Børresen
 Serenade for horn, strings and timpani – 3 movements (1943)
Edith Borroff
Sonata for Horn and Piano
Eugene Bozza
En foret
Sur les cimes
En Irlande
Suite for four horns in F (1951)
Darijan Božič
Humoreska for Horn and Orchestra (1959)
York Bowen
Sonata in E-flat, Op.  101
 Concerto for Horn, string orchestra & timpani, Op. 150.
Brenton Broadstock
Nearer and Farther for Horn and Piano
Benjamin Britten
Serenade for Tenor, Horn and Strings, Op. 31
Canticle III: Still falls the rain, Op. 55
Margaret Brouwer
Sonata for Horn and Piano
Geoffrey Burgon
Four Horns for four Horns
Burkhard Dallwitz
Romanze
Arthur Butterworth
Romanza
Ann Callaway
Four Elements
Carlos Chávez
Sonata for Four Horns
Energía for Nine Instruments
Concerto for Four Horns
Andrea Clearfield
Songs of the Wolf
Arnold Cooke
Rondo B-major for Horn and Piano
Vladimir Cosma
Sonatine
Edward Cowie
Endymion Nocturnes for Tenor, Horn and Strings
Jean-Michel Damase
Berceuse, Op.19
Pavane Variée
Peter Maxwell Davies
Horn Concerto
Brett Dean
Three Pieces for Eight Horns
Jean Michel Defaye
Alpha
Norman Del Mar
Sonatina for two horns
Norman Dello Joio
The Mystic Trumpeter for Horn and Choir
Vladimir Djambazov
Dialog for Horn and Tape
LovenCoren for Solo Natural Horn (dedicated to Hermann Baumann)
Paul Dukas
Villanelle for horn and piano (also for horn and orchestra) (Mutopia listing)
Eric Ewazen
Sonata for Horn and Piano
Ballade, Pastorale and Dance for Flute, Horn and Piano
Grand Canon Octet
Trio for Bassoon, Horn and Piano
Jean Françaix
Divertimento
Canon à l'octave
Peter Racine Fricker
Horn Sonata
Crawford Gates
Sonata for Horn and Piano, Op. 48 
Reinhold Glière
Horn Concerto in B-flat, Op. 91
Intermezzo, Op. 35, No. 11
Nocturne, Op. 35, No. 10
Romance, Op. 35, No. 6
Valse Triste, Op. 35, No. 7
Ruth Gipps
Horn Concerto op.58
Iain Hamilton
"Voyages" for horn and chamber orchestra
Sonata Notturna for horn and piano
Walter Hartley
"Sonoroties II" for horn and piano
Meditation
Fantasy on Vermont Tunes
Bernhard Heiden
Sonata for horn and piano

Concerto for Horn and Orchestra
Paul Hindemith
Horn Sonata (1939)
Horn Concerto
Sonata for Four Horns (1952)
Emil Hlobil
Sonate, Op. 21
Frigyes Hidas
Horn Concerto No. 1
 Horn Concerto No. 2
Horn Concerto No. 3
Heinz Holliger
Cynddaredd – Brenddwyd (Fury – Dream)
Robin Holloway
Horn Concerto, Op. 43
Andante and Variations, transcription of Schumann's op.46 for horn, 2 'celli and 2 pianos
Serenata Notturna op.52 for four horns and chamber orchestra
Trio op. 113 for horn, cello and piano
Alan Hovhaness
"Artik", Concerto for Horn and String Orchestra,  Op.  78
Yoshirō Irino
Globus I for Horn and Percussion (1971)
Gordon Jacob
Concerto for Horn and Strings (1951)
Leoš Janáček
Concertino
Knud Jeppesen
Little Trio in D major
Wojciech Kilar
Sonata for horn and piano
Volker David Kirchner
Tre poemi
Lamento d'Orfeo
Anđelko Klobučar
Canzone for Horn and Organ
Diptih for Horn and Strings
Diptih for Horn and Organ
Miniature
Sonate for Horn and Organ
Movement for Horn and String Quartet
Trio for Horn, Violine and Piano
Oliver Knussen
Horn Concerto
Charles Koechlin
Horn Sonata Op.70
Jan Koetsier
Cinq Nouvelles for four horns, Op. 34a (1947)
Sonate for horn and harp
Siegfried Köhler
Sonate, Op.  32
Włodzimierz Kotoński
Quartettino, for 4 horns (1950)
Uroš Krek
Concerto for Horn and strings

Horn Concerto "Study in Jazz"
Ballade, Op. 94
William Kraft
Evening Voluntaries
Fanfare LA Festival '87 for Eight Trumpets, Four Horns, Four Trombones and Timpani
Veils and Variations for Horn and Orchestra
Igor Kuljerić
Concerto for Horn and Strings
Johan Kvandal
 Introduction and Allegro, Op. 30
Lars-Erik Larsson
Concertino for Horn and String Orchestra, Op. 45, No. 5
Benjamin Lees
Concerto for French horn and Orchestra
György Ligeti
Trio for Violin, Horn and Piano (1982)
Hamburg Concerto (1998)
Magnus Lindberg
Campana in Aria for horn and orchestra (1998)
Trygve Madsen
Sonata, Op.  24
Josip Magdić
Concertino for Horn and instrumental ensemble
Hommage a Boris, for 2 Horns and Strings
Elegie for Horn and Piano, Op. 7
Concert gravure for Horn and Chamber ensemble (Koncertantne gravire za rog i komorni ansambl), Op. 50

Foxtrot for Tomcat
David Maslanka
Sonata for Horn and Piano (1996, revised 1999)
John McCabe
The Goddess Trilogy for Horn and Piano
The Castle of Arianrhod
Floraison
Shapeshifter
Olivier Messiaen
Des canyons aux étoiles..., VI.Appel interstellaire
Le tombeau de Jean-Pierre Guézec
Miroslav Miletić
Concerto for Horn and Strings
Three Scherzo for Horn and Violine
Monolog
Stephen Montague
Horn Concerto
Lodewijk Mortelmans
Lyrische Pastorale for Horn and Orchestra (or Piano)
Thea Musgrave
Horn Concerto
Music, for horn and piano
Hermann Neuling
 Bagatelle for Low Horn und Piano
Carl Nielsen
 Canto Serioso
Sparre Olsen
Aubade, Op. 57, No. 3

Small suite for 4 Horns
Boris Papandopulo
Elegy for horn and harp

Concerto for Horn and Orchestra
Jiri Pauer
Horn Concerto (1957)
Walter Perkins
Concerto for Four Horns
Ivo Petrić
Horn Concerto
Gemini concertino for Violin, Horn and six instruments
Three compositions for Horn
Music for five for Horn and four percussions
Lyric Fragment for Mezzo-soprano, Horn and Piano
Sonata No. 1 for Horn and Piano
Lyrics for Horn and Piano
Sonata No. 2 for Horn and Piano
Werner Pirchner
Born for Horn for five (four?) horns, PWV 36
Wolfgang Plagge
Sonata No. 1 for Horn and Piano, Op. 8
Sonata No. 2 for Horn and Piano
Sonata No. 3 for Horn and Piano
A Litany for the 21st Century

Sonate, Op.  8
Almeida Prado
Trio from the Diary of Pero Vaz de Caminha
Celectial Charts III
Francis Poulenc
Élégie for horn and piano, Op. 168 (1957)
Dušan Radić
Concerto for oboe, horn and orchestra (1985)
Preludio, aria e rondo for oboe, horn and piano (1985)
 Guido Santórsola
Concerto for 4 horns and orchestra (1967)
Peter Schickele
"Pentangle" Five Songs for Horn and Orchestra
Othmar Schoeck
Horn Concerto
Peter Seabourne
Double Concerto for horn and Orchestra (2012)
The Black Pegasus – Rhapsody for horn and piano (2018)
Humphrey Searle
Aubade for Horn and Strings
Mátyás Seiber
Nocturne for horn and strings
Vissarion Shebalin
Concertino, Op. 14, No. 2
Robert Simpson
Horn Trio
Horn Quartet
Yngve Sköld
Horn Concerto, Op. 74
Ethel Smyth
Concerto for Violin, Horn and Orchestra
Rand Steiger
A New-Slain Knight
Richard Strauss
Two Études in E-flat and E, for solo horn, TrV 15 (1873)
Introduction, Theme and Variations in E-flat, for horn and piano, TrV 70 (1878)
Andante in C, for horn and piano, TrV 155 (1888)
Horn Concerto No. 1 in E-flat, Op. 11 (1883)
Horn Concerto No. 2 in E-flat, TrV 283 (1942)
Igor Štuhec
Concert Fantasy for horn and strings
Four compositions for Horn and Piano
Tema con variazioni for Violin, Horn and Piano
Stjepan Šulek
Concerto for Horn and Orchestra
Randall Svane
Horn Concerto 1991
At The Round Earth's Imagined Corners 1993 (tenor, horn, timpani, strings)
Josef Tal
Duo for oboe & English horn (1992)
Alexander Tcherepnin
Six Pieces for Four Horns
Michael Tippett
Sonata for 4 Horns
Henri Tomasi
Chant Corse for Horn and Piano
Danse Profane for Horn and Piano
Horn Concerto
Ernest Tomlinson
Rhapsody and Rondo for Horn and Orchestra
Romance and Rondo for Horn and Orchestra
Kerry Turner
Sonata for Horn and Piano
Twas a Dark and Stormy Night (horn and piano)
Concerto for Low Horn and Chamber Orchestra

Nachtpoema for Horn and Orchestra (or Piano)
Jane Vignery
Sonate, Op.  7
Heitor Villa-Lobos
Chôros No. 3, for clarinet, alto saxophone, bassoon, three horns, and trombone
Chôros No. 4, for three horns and trombone
Gilbert Vinter
Hunter's moon
Errollyn Wallen
At the Ending of a Year
Julius Weismann
Horn Concertino
Alec Wilder
Sonatas Nos. 1-3 for Horn and Piano
Suite for Horn and Piano
Yehuda Yannay
 Hidden Melody for French horn and cello

Unaccompanied 
Hans Erich Apostel
Sonatine, Op.  39 b
Malcolm Arnold
Fantasy for Horn, Op. 88
Milton Babbitt
Around The Horn
Hermann Baumann
Elegia for solo natural horn
Sigurd Berge
Hornlokk (Horn Call)
Horn 2000
Richard Bissill
Lone Call and Charge, for solo
Vitaly Buyanovsky
Pieces – Four Improvisations from Traveling Impressions
Finland Sonate
Baumann-Sonate
Peter Maxwell Davies
Sea Eagle
Stephen Dodgson
"Cor Leonis"
Jörg Herchet
Einschwingen
Douglas Hill
"Jazz Set" horn solo
Character Pieces for Solo Horn
Abstraction, for solo horn and 8 horns
Jazz Soliloquies for horn "Laid Back" Laid back
Robin Holloway
Partita no.1 for solo horn op 61 no.1
Partita no.2 for solo horn op 61 no.2
Ivo Josipović
Prelude and Fuge for Horn
Viktor Kalabis
Invokation

Laudatio for Horn Solo
Henri Lazarof
Intrada for solo horn
Robert Hall Lewis
Monophony VI
Lior Navok
Six Pieces for Solo Horn
Vincent Persichetti
Parable for Solo Horn
Wolfgang Plagge
Monoceros : Das Einhorn, Op. 51
Anthony Plog
"Postcards"
Esa-Pekka Salonen
Concert Etude
Giacinto Scelsi
Quattro Pezzi
Mark Schultz
Podunk Lake (1993)
Glowing Embers (1994)
Karlheinz Stockhausen
In Freundschaft

21st century
Kalevi Aho
Horn Concerto
Michael Conway Baker
Remeberances for Horn, Harp, Strings & Wordless Choir, Op. 130
Brian Balmages
Pele for solo horn and wind ensemble
Karol Beffa
Five o'clock, for flute, oboe, clarinet, bassoon and horn
Buenos Aires, for brass quintet
Le Pavillon d'or, for flute, oboe, clarinet, bassoon, trumpet, horn, trombone, harp, piano, 1 percussion, string quintet
Jeffrey Bishop
Spells and Incantations

Bagatela for Horn in F and Piano
Ole Buck
Kindergarten für Flöte, Oboe, Horn und Violine
Sonnabend für Flöte, Oboe, Horn und Violine
Howard J. Buss
A Day in the City for solo horn
Alien Loop de Loopsfor horn and electronic recording
Aquarius for three horns
Ballad for horn and piano
Dreams from the Shadows for horn and vibraphone
Fables from Aesop for horn and violin
Fanfare for a Golden Era for 15 horns (written for the 50th Anniversary of the International Horn Symposium, 2018)
Four Miniatures for 2 horns
Imaginations for horn, trombone and piano
In Memoriam for horn and piano
Interstellar for horn, tuba, and electronic recording
Into the Hall of Valor for horn and band (written for the 50th Anniversary of the International Horn Symposium, 2018)
Into the Hall of Valor for horn and piano
Jazzical #4 for forn, trombone, tuba, and piano
Levi's Dream for 4 horns
Night Tide for horn and marimba
Passage to Eden for clarinet, horn and piano
Pathways for 4 horns
Prayer for 12 horns
Prelude and Intrada for 4 horns
Seasons of Change for solo horn
Time Capsule for 2 horns
Trio Lyrique for horn, bassoon and piano
Elliott Carter
Horn concerto
Pavle Dešpalj
Festival Parade for Horn and Symphonic Orchestra
Anders Eliasson
 Concert for Horn and Orchestra
 Konzert: Farfalle E Ferro for Horn and String- orchestra
Eric Ewazen
Concerto for Horn and String Orchestra
Richard Faith
 Movement No. 2 for Horn and Piano
Jelena Firssowa
Kammerkonzert No. 4 for Horn and 13 Instruments
Kenneth Fuchs
Canticle to the Sun (2005)
David Gillingham
Concerto for Horn and Symphonic Band
Friedrich Goldmann
Trio für Horn, Violine und Klavier

Concerto for Horn
James Horner
Collage for four horns and orchestra
Jouni Kaipainen
Concerto for Horn and Orchestra, Op.  61 (2000–01)
Milko Kelemen
Horn and Strings
Matthew King
King's Wood Symphony (21 horns with optional percussion and electronics)
King's Wood Trio (horn, violin and piano)
King's Wood Nonet (9 horns with electronics)
Peter Lieberson
Horn Concerto

Symphonie fleuve for horn and orchestra, Op. 20 (2005–07)
Pamela J. Marshall
"wild horn whose voice the woodland fills" for eight horns
Colin Matthews
Horn Concerto (2001)
Krzysztof Penderecki
Concerto per corno e orchestra "Winterreise"
William Presser
Fantasy on the Mouldering Vine
Elegy and Caprice for Horn and Piano
Sonatina
Rhapsody on a Peaceful Theme
Simon Proctor
Concerto for Horn
Craig Russell
Rhapsody for Horn and Orchestra (Morning's Decisions, Dizzy Bird, Wistful Musing, Tito Machito, Flash)
Aulis Sallinen
Horn Concerto, Op.  82 "Campane ed Arie" (2002)
Mark Schultz
Lights! (2003)
Thomas Sleeper
Concerto for Horn and Orchestra 
Karlheinz Stockhausen
Nebadon, for horn and 8-channel electronic music
Herbert Willi
Äon (concerto for horn)
John Williams
Concerto for Horn (Angelus, Battle of Trees, Pastorale, Hunt,  Nocturne)
Charles Wuorinen
Horn Trio
Horn Trio Continued

Canto de la Audaz Huida, Op. 115, Epic Poem for Soprano, Horn and Piano inspired in the historical episode Éxodo Jujeño
Concierto para Corno y Orquesta, Op. 116, Concerto for Horn and Orchestra
Isidora Žebeljan
 Dance of the Wooden Sticks, for horn and strings (or string quintet)
Salvador Brotons
Ab Origine, Horn Concerto opus 114  (Ab Origine-Ciaccona/Cadenza-Giga)** Premiered by Javier Bonet in 2009 with the National Orchestra of Spain conducted by Josep Pons
Juan José Colomer
Naturaleza Humana-Concerto for Horn, Horn Chorus and orchestra, premiered in 2004 by Javier Bonet. Recorded in the label VERSO

Unaccompanied 
Dennis Báthory-Kitsz
Ciglerania
Sweet Ovals

Változo Felhök
Night Bird. A locrian short for Peter Reit 2012. L227
Howard J. Buss
A Day in the City
On the Stroke of Midnight
Seasons of Change
Martin Butler
Hunding

Les Trois Roses du Cimetière de Zaro (A.V.18)
Trygve Madsen
The Dream of The Rhinoceros, Op. 92
Ricardo Matosinhos
Reflections, op.71 (2016)
Mirage, op.83 (2019)
Improviso, op.82 (2019)
Pastoral, op.81 (2019)
Siegfried Matthus
Hoch willkommt das Horn
Krzysztof Penderecki
Capriccio per Radovan "Il sogno di un cacciatore"
Jörg Widmann
Air für Horn solo
Yehuda Yannay
Hornology for solo French horn
Salvador Brotons
Ab Origine, opus 114 bis for natural horn solo from the horn concerto. Premiered by Javier Bonet
Shai Cohen
ER=EPR for French Horn and live electronics

See also
 Horn trio

 
Horn